The Return of the Spirit also known as The Soul Return (aliases: Return of the Spirit or Return of Soul or The Return of Consciousness, translit: Awdat Al-Roh, French: Retour de l'Esprit) is a 1977 Egyptian television miniseries starring Salah Zulfikar and directed by Hussein Kamal. The series is based on the 1933 novel written by Tawfiq Al-Hakim under the same name.

Plot 
A young man who lives with his father's family of three uncles, who all fall in love with their neighbor who does not care about one of them, but she loves a neighbor in the same house, which makes one of the women do black magic to separate them, and suddenly Egyptian Revolution of 1919. The neighbors' situation changes and they decide to participate in the revolution, but they are arrested and they are all placed in one prison, then they fall ill and are taken to the hospital in one room, and each one begins to recall his memories.

Novel adaptation 
The novel inspired by the series, which takes place during the Egyptian Revolution of 1919, is considered one of the most important literary works in the first half of the 20th century and was presented also in the theater. Critics say that this series is the best work of art that conveys the spirit of the original literary work of the Egyptian author Tawfiq al-Hakim.

Cast

Primary cast 

 Salah Zulfikar as Selim
 Ihsan Al-Qalawi as Zanouba
 Layla Hamada as Saneya
 Ali Al-Ghandour as Hanafi
 Ibrahim Saafan as Mabrouk
 Widad Hamdi as Bassiounieh
 Mohammed Reda as the teacher Kamel
 Wagdi Al-Arabi as Mustafa
 Issam Al-Ashri as Mohsen

Supporting cast 

 Muhammad Al-Arabi as Abdo
 Younes Shalaby as Aliwa
 Malak El Gamal as Nana'a
 Abdul Rahim Al-Zarqani as Uncle Hassan
 Nazim Shaarawy as Dr. Helmy
 Sabri Abdel Aziz as Rizk
 Ibrahim Al-Shami as Hamed
 Nahed Samir as Dawlat Hanim
 Abdullah Farghali as Bustami
 Mohamed Shawky as Maimoon Gaber Maimon
 Gamalat Zayed as Umm Sahloul
 Saifullah Mukhtar as Nazaka
 Etidal Shaheen as Safinaz Hanim
 Mohammed Farhat Omar as Al-Sabilji
 Jamil Ezz El Din as Kazuli
 Ali Gohar as Mr. Black
 Medhat Ghaly as Monsieur Fox
 Ahmed Salah El-Din as Jamil Al-Hallaq
 Yahya Tawfik as the family barber

See also 
 List of Egyptian television series
 Soap opera
 Salah Zulfikar filmography

References

External links 

 The Return of the Spirit on elCinema
 

Arabic television series
Egyptian drama television series
Egyptian Radio and Television Union original programming